The 2002 Arab Junior Athletics Championships was the tenth edition of the international athletics competition for under-20 athletes from Arab countries. It took place in Cairo, Egypt – the city hosted the tournament once before in 1986. A total of 43 athletics events were contested, 22 for men and 21 for women. After an absence in 2000, regional powers Morocco, Algeria and Qatar all returned to the tournament.

Morocco topped the table with twelve gold medals, followed by Egypt which won eight titles. Tunisia and Saudi Arabia each won six medals, with Tunisia mainly having success in women's events and Saudi Arabia winning only men's medals. A women's pole vault was added to the programme, leaving just the steeplechase as the remaining event contested by men but not women. Junior implements were used in the throws events for the first time.

Morocco's Yassine Bensghir completed a men's middle-distance double and was the World Junior Champion that same year. Ismail Ahmed Ismail was third to him in the 800 metres, but went on to much greater success as a senior, winning Sudan's first Olympic medal in 2008. The sprints saw the rise of Yahya Habeeb and Yahya Al-Ghahes of Saudi Arabia (both future Asian champions). The men's throws saw the emergence of a new generation of athletes who would dominate regionally: Sultan Al-Hebshi and Ali Al-Zinkawi later won Asian titles in their disciplines, while the Egyptian trio of Yasser Ibrahim Farag, Omar Ahmed El Ghazaly and Mohsen Mohamed Anani later won gold medals at the African Championships in Athletics in the shot put, discus and hammer throw, respectively.

In women's events, sprint medallists Muna Jabir Adam and Gretta Taslakian each later became continental medallists in their specialities. Mariem Alaoui Selsouli was a medallist in both long-distance events and later won medals at the IAAF World Indoor Championships.

Medal summary

Men

Women

Medal table

References

Arab Junior Athletics Championships
International athletics competitions hosted by Egypt
Sports competitions in Cairo
Arab Junior Athletics Championships
Arab Junior Athletics Championships
2000s in Cairo
2002 in youth sport
Athletics in Cairo